Silcox is an unincorporated area and railway point in Census division 23 in Northern Manitoba, Canada. The eponymous Silcox Creek passes nearby to the south on its way to the Owl River, a tributary of Hudson Bay.

History
Silcox was founded with the building of the Hudson Bay Railway in the third decade of the 20th century. When the originally intended final section line route to Port Nelson was abandoned, the construction of the new route of the final section from Amery north to Churchill, which opened in 1929, led to its founding. Silcox lies on the line between the settlements of Thibaudeau to the south and Herchmer to the north.

Transportation
Silcox is the site of Silcox railway station, served by the Via Rail Winnipeg–Churchill train.

References

Unincorporated communities in Northern Region, Manitoba